Central High School is a public high school (grades 9-12) in Memphis, Tennessee, United States.  Since it was founded in the early 1900s and is considered the first high school in Memphis; Central is often called "THE" High School. It is a part of the Shelby County Optional School system where it is recognized as a school specializing in college preparatory programs. The principal is Gregory McCullough. Central's mascot is the Warrior and the school colors are green and gold. For recognition as the successor to Memphis High School, the first high school in Memphis, Central High's football team, rather than having artwork denoting the "Warrior" mascot, simply has a capital "H", for THE High School

History 
Central High was built in 1911 by the Memphis Board of Education, when the current building was erected on Raleigh Avenue, now called Bellevue Blvd.  It is in the Jacobean Revival architecture style, with corner pavilions on the west facade, and rusticated surrounds on the upper story windows.  Though there have been additions, the school retains is architectural integrity. Central High's building was added to the National Register of Historic Places on September 17, 1982.

Academics 
Central High School offers a traditional program of academics as well as an Optional College Preparatory Program. Honors and Advanced Placement courses are offered.

Demographics
In 2014, 405 students received diplomas.  ACT composite scores for the 2014-2015 school year were 18.1 vs 19.8 for the state and 21.1 national.

Extra-curricular activities, clubs and organizations 
Central High School has clubs in foreign language, volunteer service, and honor societies. Central's extracurricular activities include:

Concert Choir
Mixed Chorale
Warrior Band
Jazz Band
Orchestra
Color Guard (Flag Girls)
Cheerleading
Dance Team
Baseball
Softball
Swim Team
Golf
Football
Girls' Soccer
Boys' Soccer
Volleyball
Boys' Cross Country
Girls' Cross Country
Boys' Track
Girls' Track
Lady Warriors Basketball
Warriors Basketball
Student Council
Future Business Leaders of America
Youth Crusaders Club
Newspaper Staff
Yearbook Staff
Broadcasting/Media Concepts
French Club
Spanish Club
Latin Club
DECA
Bowling
JROTC
Mu Alpha Theta
National Honor Society
International Club
National English Honor Society
Mock Trial Team
Key Club
Knowledge Bowl Team
Chess Club
GSA (Gender Sexuality Alliance)  
Debate Team
E warriors(Gaming club)

Notable alumni 

Avron Fogelman -  Memphis businessman
Alex Chilton - musician of the Box Tops – “The Letter” - would have been CHS '69, but dropped out when The Letter became a hit
Art Tait - American football player in the National Football League (NFL)
Bette Greene - CHS ’52; author “Summer of My German Soldier”
Kemmons Wilson - founder of Holiday Inn
Charles W. Burson - CHS '62; legal counsel and chief of staff to Vice-President Al Gore
George Barnes alias Machine Gun Kelly
Terry Manning - music producer, photographer
William Sanderson - CHS ’62; "Larry" on the Newhart show
John Farris - CHS ’55; author “Harrison High”, a fictional account of Central High
John S. Bull - CHS '52, NASA Astronaut Group 5 selected in 1966. 
William G. Leftwich, Jr. - Marine killed in Vietnam
William F. Barnes - football coach at UCLA
Peter Taylor - short-story writer and novelist
Lester Hudson - professional basketball player 
William Poduska - CHS '55; electrical engineer, businessman, and professor
Edward L. Stanton III - United States Attorney & federal judicial nominee
Margaret Valiant  - musician, folklorist, ethnomusicologist and activist
Jon Wells - CHS '76; alias "Thunder Paws", former drummer for Black Oak Arkansas (recorded on Ready As Hell)
Key Glock- CHS '15; music artist and rapper signed to Paper Route Empire
Pooh Shiesty -  CHS '18; rapper and music artist
Natalie Jackson - CHS '78; (a.k.a. Kudisan Kai) background vocalist for Elton John, Natalie Cole, and others

References

External links 

CHS History

Public high schools in Tennessee
School buildings on the National Register of Historic Places in Tennessee
Schools in Memphis, Tennessee
National Register of Historic Places in Memphis, Tennessee
1909 establishments in Tennessee